Reel, or Atwot, is a Nilotic language of South Sudan that is closely related to Nuer. They call themselves Reel; Atwot is their Dinka name.

Phonology

Consonants 

/t̪/ varies with [s], /c/ with [ç], /p/ with [ɸ], and /ʔ/ with [ɦ].

Vowels

Tones 
Reel has three tones - high, low, and rising.

See also 
 Atwot people
 Nilotic languages
 Western Nilotic languages

References

Western Nilotic languages